The first inauguration of Richard Nixon as the 37th president of the United States was held on Monday, January 20, 1969, at the East Portico of the United States Capitol in Washington, D.C. This was the 46th inauguration and marked the commencement of the first and eventually only full term of both Richard Nixon as president and Spiro Agnew as vice president. Chief Justice Earl Warren administered the presidential oath of office to Nixon, and Senate Minority Leader Everett Dirksen administered the vice presidential oath to Agnew. Nixon was the first non-incumbent vice president to be inaugurated as president. This was also the last presidential oath administered by Chief Justice Warren.

Inaugural address

Nixon delivered an inaugural address, after taking his oath of office.

See also 
Presidency of Richard Nixon
Second inauguration of Richard Nixon
1968 United States presidential election

References

Bibliography

External links 

  
 
 

1969 in Washington, D.C.
1969 in American politics
Inauguration 1
United States presidential inaugurations
January 1969 events in the United States